The Cape Cod Baseball League (CCBL or Cape League) is a collegiate summer baseball wooden bat league located on Cape Cod in the U.S. state of Massachusetts. One of the nation's premier collegiate summer leagues, the league boasts over one thousand former players who have gone on to play in the major leagues.

History

Pre-modern era

Origins
As early as the 1860s, baseball teams representing various Cape Cod towns and villages were competing against one another. The earliest newspaper account is of an 1867 game in Sandwich between the hometown "Nichols Club" and the visiting Cummaquid team. Though not formalized as a league, the games provided entertainment for residents and summer visitors.

In 1885, a Fourth of July baseball game was held matching teams from Barnstable and Sandwich. According to contemporary accounts, the 1885 contest may have been at least the twelfth such annual game. By the late 19th century, an annual championship baseball tournament was being held each fall at the Barnstable County Fair, an event that continued well into the 20th century, with teams representing towns from Cape Cod and the larger region.

In 1921, the Barnstable County Agricultural Society determined to limit the fair's annual baseball championship to teams from Cape Cod. Falmouth won the championship in 1921, and Osterville in 1922. Interest in baseball was growing, as was a movement to create a formal league of Cape Cod teams.

The early Cape League era (1923–1939)
The "Cape Cod Baseball League" was formed in 1923, consisting of four teams: Falmouth, Osterville, Hyannis, and Chatham. Teams were made up of players from local colleges and prep schools, along with some semi-pro players and other locals. One notable player during this period was North Truro native Danny "Deacon" MacFayden, who went on to play for seventeen years in the major leagues.

Throughout the 1920s and 1930s, the composition of the league varied from season to season. Towns did not opt to field teams in every season, and teams from other towns such as Bourne, Harwich, Orleans, Provincetown, and Wareham joined the league. Teams were not limited to league play, and often played teams from towns and cities in the larger region, as in 1929 when Falmouth played an exhibition game against the major league Boston Braves.

The league enjoyed widespread popularity throughout the 1930s, and even engendered competition in the form of the Barnstable County Twilight League and the Lower Cape Twilight League. However, as the cumulative effects of the Great Depression made it increasingly more difficult to secure funding for teams, the Cape League disbanded in 1940.

The Upper and Lower Cape League era (1946–1962)
With young men returning home after World War II, the Cape League was revived in 1946. The league now excluded paid professional or semi-pro players, and for a while attempted to limit players to those who were Cape Cod residents. The league was split into Upper Cape and Lower Cape divisions, and in addition to many of the town teams from the "old" Cape League, new teams now joined such as those representing the Massachusetts Maritime Academy, Otis Air Force Base, and the Cape Verdean Club of Harwich among others.

Modern era (1963–present)
In 1963, the Cape Cod Baseball League was reorganized and became officially sanctioned by the NCAA. The league would no longer be limited to Cape Cod residents, but would recruit college players and coaches from an increasingly wide radius.

In 1985, the league moved away from the use of aluminum bats, and became the only collegiate summer league in the nation at that time to use wooden bats. This transition began a period of significant growth in the league's popularity and prestige among MLB scouts, as well as among college players and coaches. This popularity has translated into over one thousand former players who have gone on to major league playing careers, including multiple members of the National Baseball Hall of Fame.

Structure and season

The CCBL regular season runs from mid-June through mid-August. Teams are geographically divided into the East Division and West Division. Each division consists of five teams which each play 44 regular season games, 6 games against each team from within their division, and 4 games against each team from the other division. 

During the latter half of the regular season, an all-star game is contested between the all stars from the East and West divisions, and features a pre-game home run hitting contest. The CCBL All-Star Game was played at Fenway Park from 2009 to 2011, but is normally played at one of the CCBL home fields.

Following the regular season, the top four teams in each division qualify for the playoffs, which is an elimination tournament consisting of three rounds of best of three series to determine the league champion and winner of the Arnold Mycock trophy.

Teams

Current teams

Origin of team nicknames
Prior to 2009, six of the ten teams in the CCBL shared their team nickname with a team in Major League Baseball (MLB). However, in late 2008 MLB announced that it would enforce its trademarks, and required those CCBL teams to either change their nicknames or buy their uniforms and merchandise only through MLB-licensed vendors.

Three of the teams eventually changed their nicknames. In 2009, the Chatham Athletics became the Anglers, and the Orleans Cardinals became the Firebirds. The following season, the Hyannis Mets became the Harbor Hawks.

The Bourne Braves and Yarmouth–Dennis Red Sox, teams who share nicknames with Boston's two historic professional baseball franchises, chose to keep their nicknames and use MLB licensees for their merchandise.

MLB could not enforce the "Mariners" trademark against the Harwich Mariners because the use of the nickname by Harwich predated the entry of the Seattle Mariners into MLB as an expansion team in 1977.

The four teams whose nicknames were not in conflict with MLB have locally themed names such as the nautical monikers of the Falmouth Commodores and Brewster Whitecaps. The Cotuit Kettleers nickname recalls a legendary local Native American land transaction whose terms of sale involved the exchange of a brass kettle. The Wareham Gatemen are the only team that does not play its home games on Cape Cod, as the town of Wareham sits on the edge of the mainland, at the "gateway" to Cape Cod.

Franchise timelines

Origins

Below is a partial list of Cape Cod baseball teams from the 1860s until the formation of the Cape League in 1923.

Barnstable Cummaquids
Barnstable Osceolas
Barnstable Village
Chatham
Falmouth Cottage Club
Harwich
Hyannis
Orleans Pants Factory
Osterville
Sandwich Athletics
Sandwich Nichols Club
West Barnstable Mastetuketts
West Falmouth
Yarmouth Mattakeesetts

Early Cape League era (1923–1939)

Upper and Lower Cape League era (1946–1962)

Beginnings of the modern era (1963–1987)

From 1963 to 1969, the newly reorganized league maintained the Upper Cape/Lower Cape divisional structure, with the championship series played by the winners of each division. Beginning in 1970, the divisional structure gave way to a single combined league, with the top four teams in the league advancing to the playoffs. This combined league structure continued through 1987.

Present Day

In 1988, the Bourne Braves and the Brewster Whitecaps joined the CCBL as expansion teams and the resulting ten-team league was split into East and West divisions. Since 1988, there have been no changes to the league's franchise composition or divisional alignments.

League championships

* During the 1923–1939 era, postseason playoffs were a rarity. In most years, the regular season pennant winner was simply crowned as the league champion.However, there were four years in which the league split its regular season and crowned separate champions for the first and second halves. In two of thoseseasons (1936 and 1939), a single team won both halves and was declared overall champion. In the other two split seasons (1933 and 1935), a postseasonplayoff series was contested between the two half-season champions to determine the overall champion.

All-Star Game

The first CCBL All-Star Game took place in 1946, as a squad of Cape League stars battled a collection of Boston Red Sox tryout players. Throughout the Upper and Lower Cape League era (1946–1962), the two divisions routinely featured both intra-divisional all-star contests, as well as an annual inter-divisional CCBL All-Star Game. From 1957 to 1961, the CCBL All-Star Game was sponsored by P. Ballantine and Sons Brewing Company. Ballantine was a major advertising sponsor of the New York Yankees, and arranged for appearances at the CCBL festivities by Yankee alumni including Phil Rizzuto, Elston Howard, Whitey Ford, Moose Skowron, Bill Stafford, Eddie Lopat, and Mel Allen, as well as Brooklyn Dodgers great Roy Campanella.

As the league's modern era began, the All-Star Game continued to be contested between the CCBL's Upper Cape (western) and Lower Cape (eastern) divisions from 1963 to 1969. In 1963, an additional All-Star Game was played by a team from the CCBL against a team from the southeastern Massachusetts-based Cranberry League. The game was played at Keith Field in Sagamore, and the CCBL came out on top, 15–2.

From 1970 to 1987, a team of stars from the CCBL played an annual interleague All-Star Game against stars from the Atlantic Collegiate Baseball League (ACBL). The games were typically played at major league stadiums including Fenway Park, Yankee Stadium and Shea Stadium in New York, and Philadelphia's Veterans Stadium.

Since 1988, the All-Star Game has been contested between stars representing the CCBL's East and West divisions, and has also featured a pre-game home run hitting contest. The event is normally held at one of the CCBL home fields, though it returned to Fenway Park for a three-year stretch from 2009 to 2011.

Annual award winners

The league annually presents several individual awards, including:

 The Pat Sorenti MVP Award
 The Robert A. McNeece Outstanding Pro Prospect Award
 The BFC Whitehouse Outstanding Pitcher Award
 The Russ Ford Outstanding Relief Pitcher Award
 The Daniel J. Silva Sportsmanship Award
 The Manny Robello 10th Player Award
 The John J. Claffey Outstanding New England Player Award
 The Thurman Munson Award for Batting Champion

Statistical records
Individual season records below are for a 42-game regular season from 1963 to 1987 and a 44-game regular season from 1988–present.Aluminum bats were used from 1975 through 1984.

Individual batting, season (1963–present)

Individual pitching, season (1963–present)

Presidents and commissioners

Hall of Fame and Museum

The CCBL Hall of Fame and Museum is a history museum and hall of fame honoring past players, coaches, and others who have made outstanding contributions to the CCBL. Since its inaugural class in 2000, the Hall of Fame has held annual inductions of new members, enshrining over 160 members to date.

Originally opened to the public in 2003 at the Heritage Museums and Gardens in Sandwich, the Hall of Fame and Museum moved in 2008 to the lower level of the John F. Kennedy Hyannis Museum in Hyannis, Massachusetts. In 2017, it moved from this location, and is currently awaiting the completion of its new home within the planned Total Athletics of Cape Cod sports training facility in Hyannis.

Inductees (by year):
 2000 – Dick Bresciani; Bill Enos; Mike Flanagan; Ed Lyons; Lennie Merullo; Thurman Munson; Arnold Mycock; Jeff Reardon; Danny Silva; Frank Thomas; Mo Vaughn; Merrill "Red" Wilson
 2001 – Cal Burlingame; Fred Ebbett; Darin Erstad; Chuck Knoblauch; Tony Plansky; Terry Steinbach; Robin Ventura
 2002 – Curly Clement; Ron Darling; Russ Ford; Nomar Garciaparra; George Greer; George Karras; Bernie Kilroy; Bill Livesey; Paul Mitchell; Buck Showalter; Dick Sullivan; Jason Varitek
 2003 – Ed Baird; Sean Casey; Joe Jabar; Noel Kinski; Jack McCarthy; Carlos Pena; Jim Perkins; Ron Perry Jr.; Judy Walden Scarafile; Cory Snyder; Pat Sorenti
 2004 – Roy Bruninghaus; Bob Butkus; John Caneira; Will Clark; Pat Hope; Eric Milton; Jim Norris; Don Reed; Dave Staton; Tello Tontini
 2005 – Mike Curran; Bobby Kielty; Mickey Morandini; Sam Nattile; Pat Pacillo; Manny Pena; Jack Sanford; Tim Teufel; John Thoden; Ken Voges
 2006 – Steve Balboni; Rik Currier; Steve Duda; Jim Hubbard; Ross Jones; Greg Lotzar; Lance Niekro; Josh Paul; Allen (Buzzy) Wilcox
 2007 – Del Bender; Scott Hemond; Dick Licini; John Morris; Steve Saradnik; Bob Schaefer; Walt Terrell; Jack Walsh; John Wylde
 2008 – Derrick DePriest; Bob Hansen; Jeff Innis; Robert A. McNeece; Matt Murton; Roche Pires; Ben Sheets; Mike Stenhouse
 2009 – Mark Angelo; John Awdycki; Zane Carlson; Lou Lamoriello; Joe "Skip" Lewis; Joe Magrane; Art Quirk; Bill Schroeder; Pie Traynor; Greg Vaughn
 2010 – David Aardsma; Casey Close; Jack Cressend; Peter Ford; Wayne Granger; Tom Grieve; Mike Loggins; Lou Merloni; Steve Robbins; Tom Weir
 2011 – David Bush; Doug Fisher; Scott Kamieniecki; Mike Lowell; Paul O'Neill; Mark Smith; Eric Wedge; Bill Wissler
 2012 – John "Jack" Aylmer; Billy Best; John Carroll; Dan DeMichele; Danny "Deacon" MacFayden; Andrew Miller; Laurin "Pete" Peterson; Jim Sherman
 2013 – Garrett Atkins; Daniel Carte; Merrill Doane; Ed Drucker; Mickey O'Connor; Jim Prete; Ryan Speier; Matt Wieters
 2014 – Eric Beattie; Phil Corddry; Sam Fuld; Donald Hicks Sr.; Bob St. Pierre
 2015 – (None)
 2016 – J.C. Holt; Warner Jones; Jim McCollom; Mark Petkovsek; Kyle Roller; Kolten Wong
 2017 – Joey Cora; Dennis Long; Justin Masterson; Tim McIntosh; Steve Newell; Jeremy Sowers; Chuck Sturtevant; Tom Yankus
 2018 – Arthur "Ace" Adams; Barbara Ellsworth; Peter Gammons; Craig Hansen; John Schiffner; Mark Sweeney
 2019 – Paul Galop; Conor Gillaspie; Brad Linden; Chris Overman; Scott Pickler; Kyle Schwarber; Shaun Seibert; Nick Zibelli
 2020 – Charles P. "Buzz" Bowers; Bob Corradi; Tyler Horan; Harry Nelson; Kevin Newman, Cliff Pennington, Harvey Shapiro; Sol Yas
 2021 – (None; class of 2020 ceremonies postponed to 2021 due to coronavirus pandemic)
 2022 – Marcus Stroman; Ian Happ; Billy Wagner; Justin Smoak; Patrick Biondi; Steven Wilson

Alumni in the National Baseball Hall of Fame

The following former CCBL players have been inducted into the National Baseball Hall of Fame in Cooperstown, New York.

In addition to the player inductees below, Cooperstown also honored longtime CCBL president Judy Walden Scarafile in 2010 by featuring her in the museum's Diamond Dreams exhibit, which highlights stories of pioneering women in baseball.

See also
 Cape Cod Baseball League ballparks
 Cape Cod Baseball League coaches
 Cape Cod Baseball League players
 Cape Cod Baseball League players (pre-modern era)
 List of Collegiate Summer Baseball Leagues
 Summer Catch, a 2001 American romantic comedy film set in the Cape Cod Baseball League.

References

External links
 Cape Cod Baseball League
 Collegiate Summer Baseball Register

Official Team Websites
 Bourne Braves
 Brewster Whitecaps
 Chatham Anglers
 Cotuit Kettleers
 Falmouth Commodores
 Harwich Mariners
 Hyannis Harbor Hawks
 Orleans Firebirds
 Wareham Gatemen
 Yarmouth-Dennis Red Sox

1885 establishments in Massachusetts
Baseball leagues in Massachusetts
Sports in Barnstable County, Massachusetts
Sports in Plymouth County, Massachusetts
 
College baseball leagues in the United States
Sports leagues established in 1885
Summer baseball leagues